The Peanut Butter Conspiracy Is Spreading is the debut studio album by the Los Angeles psychedelic rock band, The Peanut Butter Conspiracy. It was released in March 1967 under the Columbia label.

Backed by producer Gary Usher, the band recorded one of the first instances of symphonic rock. The album utilizes vocal harmonies, and it takes influence from the psychedelic rock bands of the era. The band's style drew comparisons to The Mamas and the Papas, but the band also developed their own sound through intricate melodies and progressions that were both dark and optimistic. For recording, James Burton and Glen Campbell guested, providing backing guitar to bolster the group's sound. Later, band members reflected on the experience and disavowed their first album for the lack of studio session control they had.

Included on the album is the band's only charting single, "It's a Happening Thing", which became a favorite regionally when it charted in the KHJ Boss 30 in March 1967 and topped at number 93 on the national Billboard Hot 100. The track "Dark On You Now" was originally recorded when the band was still called The Ashes in 1966 on Vault Records. This earlier version had a slower tempo compared to the latter version. Overall, the album gained local interest in Los Angeles and charted at number 196 on the Billboard 200.

Track listing

Personnel

Peanut Butter Conspiracy
Barbara "Sandi" Robison – lead vocals, percussion
 Alan Brackett – bass guitar
 Lance Fent – lead guitar
 John Merrill – rhythm guitar
 Jim Voight – drums

Additional musicians
 James Burton – guitar
 Glen Campbell – guitar

Technical
 Gary Usher – producer
 Lawrence Dietz – liner notes

Charts

Album

Single

References

1967 debut albums
The Peanut Butter Conspiracy albums
Columbia Records albums
Albums produced by Gary Usher